The 2012 Sepang GP2 Series round was a GP2 Series motor race held on March 24 and 25, 2012 at Sepang International Circuit, Malaysia. It was the first round of the 2012 GP2 Series season. The race weekend supported the 2012 Malaysian Grand Prix.

Davide Valsecchi was on pole for the feature race, which was won by Luiz Razia. James Calado won the sprint race.

Classification

Qualifying

Notes
 – Onidi received a three grid place penalty for impeding González during the qualifying session.

Feature Race

Notes:
 — Stéphane Richelmi and Simon Trummer were both issued with twenty-second time penalties after the race when they were judged to have caused an avoidable collision.
 — Jolyon Palmer and Tom Dillmann started from the pit lane.

Sprint race

Notes:
 — Stefano Coletti and Ricardo Teixeira were both classified as having finished the race, as they had completed 90% of the winners race distance.

Standings after the round

Drivers' Championship standings

Teams' Championship standings

 Note: Only the top five positions are included for both sets of standings.

Notes

References

External links
GP2 Series official website – Results

Sepang
GP2